The Erin Mills Town Centre Bus Terminal is located in western Mississauga, Ontario, Canada. It is situated on the northeast end of Erin Mills Town Centre.

Despite being a major bus terminal, it does not contain a building. Instead, it is composed of benches and one bus shelter on the opposite side. It is also not directly connected to the mall and requires walking through the parking lots. The terminal, along with South Common Centre, could possibly be relocated to the Erin Mills BRT Station of the Mississauga Transitway, for more connectivity with other routes that are planned to serve the station.

Bus routes
Bus service within the terminal itself is exclusively by MiWay.

Also, two MiWay routes indirectly serve the terminal:
 35 Eglinton stops on Eglinton Avenue.

Directly serving the terminal 
All routes are wheelchair-accessible.

Indirectly serving the terminal 
All routes are wheelchair-accessible.

References

MiWay
Bus stations in Ontario